Dedication: The Very Best of Thin Lizzy is a compilation album released by rock group Thin Lizzy in 1991. The only previously unreleased track was "Dedication", which was reconstructed after band leader Phil Lynott's death, using an old 8 track demo recording of a Grand Slam song originally recorded around 1985 and written by guitarist Laurence Archer. This track was the subject of a High Court case, as following Lynott's death Thin Lizzy released this track as a lost Thin Lizzy track, removing Archer's guitar and the writing credit from the track (but leaving Archer's Bass intact). Archer is now credited for writing this track.

There was also a VHS video release to accompany the album.

Track listings

UK & Japanese CD

The track listing for all non-US vinyl and cassette releases, and the German CD, is the same as above minus "Bad Reputation", "Still in Love with You", "Emerald" and "Chinatown".

All US releases

VHS
"The Rocker"
"Whiskey in the Jar"
"The Boys Are Back in Town"
"Jailbreak"
"Don't Believe a Word"
"Bad Reputation"
"Dancin' in the Moonlight (It's Caught Me in Its Spotlight)"
"Rosalie" (live)
"Waiting for an Alibi"
"Do Anything You Want To"
"Sarah"
"Chinatown"
"Killer on the Loose"
"Out in the Fields"
"Dedication"

Singles
"Dedication" / "Cold Sweat" – 11 January 1991
A 12" and CD single were also released, featuring the extra tracks "Emerald" (live) / "Still in Love With You" (live).
A 12" picture disc was also released, with two different tracks, "Chinatown" / "Bad Reputation".
"The Boys Are Back in Town (Remix)" / "Sarah" – 11 March 1991
A 12", picture disc and CD single were also released, all featuring four tracks: "The Boys Are Back in Town (Remix)" / "Johnny the Fox Meets Jimmy the Weed" / "Black Boys on the Corner" / "Me and the Boys (Live)".

Personnel
Phil Lynott – bass guitar, vocals
Brian Downey – drums, percussion
Eric Bell – guitar on tracks 1 and 2
Scott Gorham – guitar on tracks 3–12, 15, 16 and 18 (plus the US-only tracks)
Brian Robertson – guitar on tracks 3–5, 8–10 (plus the US-only tracks)
Gary Moore – guitar on tracks 11–14 and 17
Snowy White – guitar on tracks 15 and 16
Laurence Archer - bass guitar on track 18

Charts

Album

Singles

References

1991 greatest hits albums
Thin Lizzy compilation albums
Vertigo Records compilation albums
Mercury Records compilation albums